Indianapolis International Airport  is an international airport located seven miles (11 km) southwest of downtown Indianapolis in Marion County, Indiana, United States. It is owned and operated by the Indianapolis Airport Authority. The Federal Aviation Administration (FAA) National Plan of Integrated Airport Systems for 2017–2021 categorized it as a medium hub primary commercial service facility.

The airport occupies  in Wayne and Decatur townships in Marion County. IND is home to the second largest FedEx Express hub in the world; only the FedEx SuperHub in Memphis, Tennessee surpasses its cargo traffic. Additionally, because of FedEx's activity, IND ranked as the sixth busiest U.S. airport in terms of air cargo throughput in 2020.

History

Beginnings

Indianapolis Municipal Airport opened in 1931. In 1944, it was renamed Weir Cook Municipal Airport, after US Army Air Forces Col. Harvey Weir Cook of Wilkinson, Indiana, who became a flying ace during World War I with seven victories and died flying a P-39 over New Caledonia in World War II.

Since 1962, the airport has been owned and operated by the Indianapolis Airport Authority (IAA), an eight-member board with members appointed by the Mayor of Indianapolis and other officials from Marion, Hendricks and Hamilton counties in central Indiana. In 1976, the board renamed the airport Indianapolis International Airport.

From 1957 to 2008, the passenger terminal was on the east side of the airfield off High School Road. This now-demolished facility was renovated and expanded many times, notably in 1968 (Concourses A & B), 1972 (Concourse D) and 1987 (Concourse C and the attached Parking Garage). This complex, along with the International Arrivals Terminal (opened in 1976) on the north side of the airfield (off Pierson Drive), was replaced by the Col. H. Weir Cook Terminal on November 12, 2008. 

The April 1957 OAG shows 82 weekday departures: 24 Eastern, 22 TWA, 15 Delta, 11 American, 9 Lake Central and 1 Ozark. Eastern had a nonstop to Atlanta and one to Birmingham and TWA had two to LaGuardia; no other nonstops reached beyond Chicago, St. Louis, Memphis, Louisville and Pittsburgh. (Westward nonstops didn't reach beyond St. Louis until 1967; TWA started a JFK-IND-LAX 707 that year.) The first jets were TWA 880s in 1961.

Recent years
During the late 1980s and early 1990s, USAir (later US Airways) had a secondary hub in Indianapolis with non-stop jets to the West Coast, East Coast and Florida and turboprop flights to cities around the Midwest. USAir peaked at 146 daily departures (including its prop affiliates), with 49% of all seats. USAir ended the hub in the late 1990s. 

In the late 1990s and early 2000s, Indianapolis was a hub for then locally based ATA Airlines and its regional affiliate, Chicago Express/ATA Connection. After that airline entered Chapter 11 bankruptcy protection in late 2004, operations at IND were cut, then eliminated in 2006. ATA's demise gave Northwest Airlines an opportunity to expand operations, making Indianapolis a focus city with mainline flights to the West Coast, East Coast, and the South. Northwest was later acquired by Delta Air Lines in 2008, and a decade later, Delta began service from Indianapolis to Paris beginning in May 2018. This flight was the first ever non-stop transatlantic passenger flight out of Indianapolis. The flight, DL500, was suspended in March 2020.

In 1994, BAA USA was awarded a 10-year contract to manage the Indianapolis International Airport. The contract was extended three years but was later cut a year short at the request of the BAA. Private management ended on December 31, 2007, and control reverted to IAA. Also in 1994, United Airlines finished building the Indianapolis Maintenance Center, at a cost of US$600 million. United later moved their maintenance operations to its sole maintenance hub located at San Francisco International Airport.

A new  midfield passenger terminal, which cost $1.1 billion, opened in 2008 between the airport's two parallel runways, southwest of the previous terminal and the crosswind runway. A new FAA Air Traffic Control Tower (ATCT) and Terminal Radar Approach Control (TRACON) building, the second tallest in the United States, opened in April 2006, the first component of the long-planned midfield complex. The Weir Cook Terminal itself opened for arriving flights on the evening of November 11, 2008, and for departures the following morning. HOK was its master designer, with AeroDesign Group (a joint venture among CSO Architects, SchenkelShultz Architecture and ARCHonsortium) serving as the architect of record. Aviation Capital Management (Indianapolis), a subsidiary of BSA LifeStructures, was the airport's program manager. Hunt/Smoot Midfield Builders, a joint venture of Hunt Construction Group and Smoot Construction was the construction manager. Thornton Tomasetti was the terminal's structural engineer along with Fink, Roberts and Petrie. Syska Hennessy was the mechanical, electrical, & plumbing engineer. In 2021, a six-person panel of American Institute of Architects (AIA) Indianapolis members identified the Col. H. Weir Cook Terminal among the ten most "architecturally significant" buildings completed in the city since World War II.

A 162-acre, 22 MW solar farm is at the airport. It was the largest airport solar farm in the world when the second phase opened in 2014.

In August 2017, Allegiant Air announced it would open a $40 million aircraft base at Indianapolis International Airport that would begin operations in February of the following year. The facility was to create 66 high-paying jobs by the end of year and house two Airbus aircraft.

Facilities

Terminal

Indianapolis International Airport has a single terminal with two concourses and a total of 39 gates. The current terminal opened in 2008 and is named in honor of Col. Harvey Weir Cook. It was one of the first designed and built in the U.S. following the September 11 attacks. All international arrivals are processed in Concourse A.

Concourse A contains 20 gates.
Concourse B contains 19 gates.

Ground transportation
Eight rental car operations and the Ground Transportation Center (where information about limousine, shuttle bus, hotel courtesy vehicles and other transportation services such as IndyGo bus service can be obtained) are located on the first floor of the attached parking garage. All pick-ups and drop-offs of rental vehicles also occur here, eliminating the need for shuttling customers to and from individual companies' remote processing facilities. It features a light-filled center atrium complete with a piece of suspended artwork and contains moving sidewalks to speed pedestrians into and out of the terminal building itself.

Airlines and destinations

Passenger

Cargo

Statistics

Top destinations

Airline market share

Annual traffic

Passenger traffic trends

Accidents and incidents
 On September 9, 1969, Allegheny Airlines Flight 853 on a Boston – Baltimore – Cincinnati – Indianapolis – St. Louis route, collided in midair with a Piper Cherokee during its descent over Fairland, Indiana, in Shelby County. The McDonnell Douglas DC-9-31 crashed into a cornfield near London, Indiana, killing all 78 passengers and 4 crew members on board. The student pilot who was flying the Cherokee was also killed.
 On October 20, 1987, a United States Air Force A-7D Corsair II crashed into a Ramada Inn near the airport after the pilot was forced to eject due to an engine malfunction. Ten people were killed, nine of them hotel employees.

References

External links

 Indianapolis International Airport (official site)
 

1931 establishments in Indiana
Airports established in 1931
Airports in Indiana
Buildings and structures in Indianapolis
FedEx Express
Transportation buildings and structures in Marion County, Indiana
Transportation in Indianapolis